Tavan Dasht-e Olya (also Romanized as Tavān Dasht-e ‘Olyā; also known as Tavān Dasht, Tavāndasht-e Bālā, and Tawān Dasht) is a village in Malmir Rural District, Sarband District, Shazand County, Markazi Province, Iran. At the 2006 census, its population was 336, in 101 families.

References 

Populated places in Shazand County